Hobbs Observatory  is an astronomical observatory owned and operated by University of Wisconsin–Eau Claire's Department of Physics and Astronomy and home to the Chippewa Valley Astronomical Society.   It is located in the Beaver Creek Reserve four miles North of Fall Creek, Wisconsin.  It is named after the Hobbs Foundation, a local philanthropic organization which provided money for the initial construction in 1978 and the purchase of a Navy telescope.

See also 
List of astronomical observatories

References

External links
Official website
Hobbs Observatory Clear Sky Clock Forecasts of observing conditions.

Astronomical observatories in Wisconsin
Buildings and structures in Eau Claire County, Wisconsin
Tourist attractions in Eau Claire County, Wisconsin